Lacassine (French: La Cassine) is an unincorporated community and census-designated place (CDP) in Jefferson Davis Parish in the U.S. state of Louisiana. As of the 2010 census the population was 480.

Etymology
One story about the name of the community is that a tribe of Comanche Indians, led by their chief Lacassine, migrated to southwest Louisiana to hunt and fish in the early 19th century, settling near this place.

Another story about the name states that the part of the parish where the community is located was visited regularly by different tribes of the area, including the Atakapa and Choctaw people. Game was abundant here, and the Indians called it their "hunting ground", or, in the Choctaw language, La Cassine. However, the phrase sounds more French than Indian. La Cassine means "the small house" in French. According to Monsignor Jules Daigle, noted authority of the Cajun language, it was named for a small house built by an Indian chief in that location.

Geography
Lacassine is in western Jefferson Davis Parish along U.S. Route 90, which leads west  to Iowa and east the same distance to Welsh. Interstate 10 runs along the northern edge of Lacassine, with access from Exit 48 (Louisiana Highway 101). I-10 leads west  to Lake Charles and east the same distance to Jennings, the Jefferson Davis parish seat.

West Bayou Lacassine flows southward along the eastern edge of the community, reaching tidewater at Lacassine National Wildlife Refuge  to the south.

Demographics

Economics
The Little Kahuna Water Park was being constructed off Interstate 10 in Lacassine, but was never completed due to monetary problems. Lacassine is home of the Louisiana Spirits Distillery, where Bayou Rum, a popular adult beverage in Louisiana, is distilled. Construction began in 2011 and Bayou Rum was created in 2013.

References

External links
Lacassine High School

Unincorporated communities in Jefferson Davis Parish, Louisiana
Unincorporated communities in Louisiana
Census-designated places in Jefferson Davis Parish, Louisiana
Census-designated places in Louisiana